The 1962 South Carolina gubernatorial election was held on November 6, 1962 to select the governor of the state of South Carolina. Donald S. Russell won the Democratic primary and ran unopposed in the general election becoming the 107th governor of South Carolina.

Democratic primary
The South Carolina Democratic Party held their primary for governor in the summer of 1962 and Donald S. Russell succeeded on his second attempt by easily defeating the current Lieutenant Governor and son of former governor Burnet R. Maybank. He garnered more than 50% of the vote and avoided a runoff, effectively becoming the next governor of South Carolina due to lack of opposition in the general election.

General election
The general election was held on November 6, 1962 and Donald S. Russell was elected the next governor of South Carolina without opposition. Turnout was much higher than the previous gubernatorial election because of a competitive senate race between Olin D. Johnston and W. D. Workman, Jr.

 

|-
| 
| colspan=5 |Democratic hold
|-

See also
Governor of South Carolina
List of governors of South Carolina
South Carolina gubernatorial elections

References
"Supplemental Report of the Secretary of State to the General Assembly of South Carolina." Reports and Resolutions of South Carolina to the General Assembly of the State of South Carolina. Volume II. Columbia, South Carolina: 1963, p. 7.

External links
SCIway Biography of Governor Donald Stuart Russell

1962
1962 United States gubernatorial elections
Gubernatorial
November 1962 events in the United States